Daniel B. Ullman (1918–1979) was an American screenwriter. Also writer-director and director.

Selected filmography

 Ringside (1949)
 Outlaws of Texas (1950)
 Hot Rod (1950)
 Flame of Stamboul (1951)
 Smuggler's Gold (1951)
 The Longhorn (1951)
 Fort Osage (1952)
 Montana Incident (1952)
 Wyoming Roundup (1952)
 Waco (1952)
 Kansas Territory (1952)
 The Royal African Rifles (1953)
 Sudden Danger (1955)
 At Gunpoint (1955)
 Seven Angry Men (1955)
 The Case Against Brooklyn (1958)

References

Bibliography
 Alan Gevinson. Within Our Gates: Ethnicity in American Feature Films, 1911-1960. University of California Press, 1997.

External links

1918 births
1979 deaths
20th-century American dramatists and playwrights
Screenwriters from California
Writers from Los Angeles
20th-century American screenwriters